David Shannon (born October 5, 1959) is an American writer and illustrator of children's books. Shannon grew up in Spokane, Washington. He graduated from the Art Center College of Design and now lives in Los Angeles. In 1998 he won the Caldecott Honor for his No, David!. He has also written A Bad Case of Stripes, How Georgie Radbourn Saved Baseball, and The Amazing Christmas Extravaganza.  Shannon illustrated Audrey Wood's The Bunyans, Rafe Martin's The Rough Face Girl, various books by Jane Yolen, including The Ballad of the Pirate Queens and Encounter, as well as Melinda Long's How I Became a Pirate and Pirates Don't Change Diapers.

Early life
David Shannon was born in Washington, D.C., but he also spent his childhood in Spokane, Washington. In an interview with Sonia Bolle in the Children's Literature Review (CLR), he said, "I loved Oliver Twist, but I liked the Artful Dodger more than Oliver. And I always thought the villains in Disney Movies were really cool."  Shannon said that this fondness for villains made him realize as a child that "you need both sides for a good story."

David knew he had enjoyed drawing from the time he was able to hold a crayon. As a child, David Shannon was a disruptive child in school and while attending Hutton Elementary his teachers would allow him to draw murals. This would keep him away from disrupting his classmates while also having decorative walls drawn by him.

As a student in high school, he decided early on that he wanted to have a career in an art field. Shannon enjoyed making his own illustrations to books that he was reading in high school. Shannon attended art school at the Art Center College of Design in Pasadena, California, and decided to focus on learning about political illustrations. In 1983, Shannon moved to New York City and began working for various magazines and newspapers. Two of his major jobs were for the New York Times and the Book Review. These jobs brought Shannon's work increased exposure. His first book of illustrations was Julius Lester's How Many Spots Does a Leopard Have? (1989).

Career
Shannon's first book was How Georgie Radbourn Saved Baseball (1994), where Shannon was able to incorporate his dark painting style, which came from his love of villains, with a story about baseball.

Shannon's book No David! (1998) was named a Caldecott Honor Book in 1999. This book is the story of a mischievous child whose mother is always telling him 'no'   But she reassures him at the end when she finally says, "Yes, David, I love you." According to a review in the CLR, "Readers won't be able to resist taking a walk on the wild side with this little rascal, and may only secretly acknowledge how much of him they recognize in themselves."

Shannon followed No David!  (1998) up with David Goes to School (1999) and David Gets in Trouble (2002). The latter was reviewed by Adele Greenlee, who stated that, "Children who enjoyed No, David! (1998) and David Goes to School (1999) will welcome this lighthearted sequel."

Style
An entry in the Eight Book of Junior Authors and Illustrators states, "Shannon tells his stories with vibrant, imaginative pictures. Working with acrylic paints, he creates characters and settings that both illustrate and expand the story being told. His artwork is richly colored, and the results can be funny, mischievous, ironic, sensational, spooky, serious, even epic." Shannon's work has been recognized by the American Library Association and the School Library Journal. As Dwight Garner said, "David Shannon is among this country's most respected children's book illustrators; in a field that has nearly as many award ceremonies each year as the television industry does, Shannon has taken home most of their prizes..."

In The Rain Came Down (2000), an unexpected summer shower causes great chaos in a small neighborhood. This huge shower causes a line of temper tantrums, but when the clouds suddenly break, all of the sour moods go away.  A review for CLR said, "Shannon expertly uses vertiginous angles as he builds suspense, then calms things down with a set of subdued portraits and a view of a quiet afternoon picnic."

Awards
 How Georgie Radbourn Saved Baseball (1994) was on The New York Times list as one of the Ten Best Illustrated Books of 1994.
 No David! (1998) was named as a Caldecott Honor Book, an ALA Notable Children's Book, a Bulletin of the Center for Children's Books Blue Ribbon title, a School Library Journal Best Book of the Year, and was on the New York Times Best Illustrated Book list
 The Rain Came Down (2001) was awarded the Golden Kite Award;
 How I Became a Pirate (2003) received the Booksense Best Picture Book.

Personal life
Shannon lives in Los Angeles with his wife, Heidi, and his daughter, Emma (b. 1998). Shannon is working on the screenplay for Georgie Radbourn, for a DreamWorks live-action film. He was born October 5th 1959 ( 63 years old). At the age of five, he wrote and illustrated his first book. On every page were pictures of David doing things he was not supposed to do.

Bibliography

References

External links
 Shannon at publisher Scholastic Books
 

1959 births
Living people
American children's book illustrators
American children's writers